Bergsfjord is a village in Loppa Municipality in Troms og Finnmark county, Norway. The village is located on the mainland part of Loppa Municipality, along the Bergsfjorden, across from the island of Silda. The Svartfjellet mountain lies about  straight east of the village, alongside the Svartfjelljøkelen glacier.

Bergsfjord has no road connections to the rest of Norway.  It is only accessible by ferry from the nearby villages of Sør-Tverrfjord and Øksfjord.  Bergsfjord Church is located in this village.

In 2013, the fish processing factory in the village closed down.

References

Villages in Finnmark
Loppa
Populated places of Arctic Norway